Tyrannion (or Tyrannos) (d. around 308) was bishop of Antioch as the successor of .

Tyrannion's name comes from his origin in the city of Tyre. He was bishop at the beginning of the fourth century, but otherwise very little is known about him. Even the dates of his tenure are uncertain: according to some sources, he served in the years 299–308, and according to others in the years 304–314.

References

Sources 
 Eusebius of Caesarea: Historia ecclesiastica, VII, 32.

Patriarchs of Antioch
3rd-century births
4th-century deaths